Gianluigi Paragone (born 7 August 1971) is an Italian politician and journalist.

Biography
Paragone was born in Varese in 1971. After working as a journalist for a local newspaper and a local television network, Paragone became editor of La Padania, the official newspaper of the Northern League. Subsequently, he worked for the newspaper Libero, of which he was deputy editor and (for a short period) acting editor to replace Vittorio Feltri.

In 2009, he presented the political talk show Malpensa Italia, aired in late evening on Rai 2. On 5 August 2009 he was appointed deputy director of Rai 1, thus abandoning the management of Libero. On 24 September 2009, Paragone left the Rai 1 vice-direction to become vice-director of Rai 2.

From 15 January 2010, he led the political talk show L'ultima parola on Rai 2. In 2013, he resigned as deputy director of Rai 2 and left the RAI. Subsequently, he switched to La 7, where he led the talk shows La gabbia (2013–2017) and In onda (2015).

In 2018, he was elected Senator among the ranks of the Five Star Movement, and on 1 January 2020, was officially expelled from this party, but continued his membership in the Senate as an independent. In July 2020, Paragone launched his own political party, Italexit, with the aim of bringing Italy out of the European Union.

References

1971 births
Living people
20th-century Italian journalists
Italian political party founders
Five Star Movement politicians
Italexit politicians
Senators of Legislature XVIII of Italy
Politicians from Varese
Italian eurosceptics
21st-century Italian journalists